Prezervation is a compilation album by saxophone player Stan Getz and pianist Al Haig. It was released in January 1968 and includes performances recorded between 1949 and 1950. The album features both instrumental and vocal pieces. Whilst the first eight pieces had been available on LP before, tracks 9-12 were unissued at the time of the album's release and don't feature Getz playing. Prezervation also includes the rarities "Stardust" and "Goodnight My Love", whose masters had been thought lost until being rediscovered by Don Schlitten shortly before the album's release.

Track listing
"Prezervation" (Getz) - 2:43
"Pinch Bottle" (Haig) - 3:01
"Earless Engineering" (Haig) - 2:54
"Be Still, TV" (Jimmy Raney) - 3:09
"Short P, Not LP" (Raney) - 3:19
"Stardust" (Hoagy Carmichael) - 2:41
"Goodnight My Love" (Mack Gordon, Harry Revel) - 2:40
"Intoit" (Getz) - 3:22
"Liza" (George Gershwin, Ira Gershwin, Gus Kahn) - 2:36
"Stars Fell on Alabama" (Frank Perkins, Mitchell Parish) - 3:34
"Stairway to the Stars" (Mitchell Parish, Matty Malneck, Frank Signorelli) - 3:31
"Opus Caprice" (Haig) - 2:19

Track 1 recorded on June 21, 1949; tracks 2-5 on July 28, 1949; 6-8 on January 6, 1950; 9-12 on February 27, 1950

Personnel
Stan Getz - tenor saxophone (all tracks except 9-12)
Al Haig - piano
Tommy Potter - bass
Roy Haynes - drums
Kai Winding - trombone (2-5)
Jimmy Raney - vocals (4-5), guitar
Gene Ramey - bass (1)
Stan Levey - drums (1)
Blossom Dearie - vocals (4-5)
Junior Parker - vocals (6-7)

References 

1968 compilation albums
Stan Getz albums
Prestige Records compilation albums
Albums produced by Bob Weinstock
Albums produced by Don Schlitten